Howard Bond Lockhart (April 22, 1896 - August 2, 1956) was a Canadian ice hockey goaltender who played six seasons in the National Hockey Association and the National Hockey League for the Northern Fusiliers, Toronto St. Pats, Quebec Bulldogs, Hamilton Tigers and Boston Bruins. He played 12 games in the NHA and 59 in the NHL and finished with a combined record of 23 wins and 46 losses.

The nickname "Holes" is associated with Lockhart, but there are no contemporaneous uses of the term for him, and it  appears to have been coined by hockey writer Stan Fischler sometime in the 1970s.

Lockhart holds the records for the most five-or-more goal games allowed to opposing players, with four.

Career statistics

Regular season and playoffs

References

External links

1896 births
1956 deaths
Boston Bruins players
Canadian ice hockey goaltenders
Hamilton Tigers (ice hockey) players
Ice hockey people from Ontario
Quebec Bulldogs players
Sportspeople from North Bay, Ontario
Toronto 228th Battalion players
Toronto St. Pats players